16 Biggest Hits, Volume II is a 2007 compilation album by country singer Willie Nelson.

Track listing

Personnel 
Willie Nelson – Guitar, vocals

Nelson, Willie
2007 greatest hits albums
Willie Nelson compilation albums
Albums produced by Chet Atkins
Albums produced by Brian Ahern (producer)
Albums produced by Chips Moman
Albums produced by Booker T. Jones